Ahmed El-Mehelmy (born 25 January 1962) is a former professional tennis player from Egypt.

Career
El-Mehelmy, who played collegiate tennis at the University of South Alabama, qualified for the main draw at the 1985 US Open. He lost a four set first round match to Dan Cassidy.

The Egyptian competed in Davis Cup tennis for his country from 1978 to 1990. He finished with a 22/23 competition record.

References

1962 births
Living people
Egyptian male tennis players
Sportspeople from Cairo
Mediterranean Games silver medalists for Egypt
Mediterranean Games medalists in tennis
Competitors at the 1983 Mediterranean Games
20th-century Egyptian people